James Gerard (c.1740 – 1789) was a Clergyman and Warden of Wadham College, Oxford.

Education
He was educated at John Roysse's Free School in Abingdon, (now Abingdon School) from 1751-1757.

He was Artium Magister (A.M) (13 July 1765), B.D (17 June 1777) and Doctor of Divinity (20 June 1777)

Career
He was the Warden of Wadham College, Oxford from 5 May 1777 until 1783. The warden was the term used by Wadham for the head of the college.

He gained an ecclesiastical preferment as rector of Monks Risborough in 1783. He started his appointment at Monks Risborough on 9 July 1783 on his father's (Joseph Gerard) cession.

Personal life
He married and had one child and his mother was Elizabeth Reynolds.

See also
 List of Old Abingdonians
 List of Wadham College, Oxford people

References

1789 deaths
Wardens of Wadham College, Oxford
People educated at Abingdon School
Year of birth uncertain